DeWitt Richard Searles  (August 7, 1920 – February 27, 2021) was a major general in the United States Air Force who served as Deputy Inspector General of the Air Force from 1972 to 1974. He graduated from the former Bolles Military Academy in 1939. He died in Virginia in February 2021 at the age of 100.

References

1920 births
2021 deaths
American centenarians
Men centenarians
Military personnel from Birmingham, Alabama
United States Air Force generals
Burials at Arlington National Cemetery